William Barnett House is a historic home located at Alleghany Springs, Montgomery County, Virginia.  It is a long two-story, log and frame structure consisting of a number of elements of different dates.  The earliest section may date to 1813, and is the central log section with a two-story frame or log addition and adjacent room and a frame two-room section added in the mid-19th century. It has a rear wing and is topped by a standing seam metal gable roof.  It features a two-story ornamental porch that spans the entire front of the building with chamfered posts and sawn balusters.  Also on the property are a contributing two-story, single-pen log kitchen; a small stone shed-roofed greenhouse; and a corn crib.

It was listed on the National Register of Historic Places in 1989.

References

Houses on the National Register of Historic Places in Virginia
Houses completed in 1813
Houses in Montgomery County, Virginia
National Register of Historic Places in Montgomery County, Virginia